The Dragon's Blood is a 1957 Italian fantasy film co-written and directed by Giacomo Gentilomo. It is based on Richard Wagner's Der Ring des Nibelungen.

Plot
The dying Siegland reaches the house of the dwarf Mime, begging him to raise her baby, called Sigfried, and giving him in custody the sword of Sigfried's father.

Bathing in its blood, the resulting almost invulnerability makes him the bravest fighter of his time. He discovers a magic ring and obtains Alberich's magic hat, which can make him invisible. He then goes to the court of the King Gunther of Burgund, where he wins the tournament for the hand of the beautiful princess Kriemhild, but finds an implacable opponent in Hagen von Tronje, who was defeated by him in a duel.

Thanks to his magic hat, Siegfried helps Gunther to subjugate the beautiful Brunhild, the queen of Iceland, and to make her Gunther's wife. However, after she learns of his tricks, Brunhild rejects Gunther and swears revenge against Siegfried. Hagen, meanwhile on Brunhild's side, discovers Siegfried's secret from Kriemhild: he has a vulnerable spot on his shoulder. He manages to kill Siegfried during a hunting trip, but he perishes as well in the collapsing grotto, while trying to get hold of the treasure. Upon learning of her involuntary role in Siegfried's death, Brunhild commits suicide.

Cast

Production
Dragon's Blood giant dragon was one of the earliest creatures created by special effects artist Carlo Rambaldi. Rambaldi would alter be responsible for the special effects on King Kong (1976) and E.T. (1982).

Release
Dragon's Blood was released in 1957. It was released in the United States with a longer 97 minute running time.

References

Bibliography

External links

1950s fantasy adventure films
Films directed by Giacomo Gentilomo
Sword and sorcery films
Italian fantasy adventure films
Films about dragons
Films based on Norse mythology
Films based on poems
Films set in the 5th century
1950s Italian films
Films based on the Nibelungenlied